Museo capitolare di Atri (Italian for Chapter Museum of Atri)  is a  museum of religious art in Atri, Province of Teramo (Abruzzo).

History

Collection

Notes

External links

Museums in Abruzzo
Religious museums in Italy
Atri, Abruzzo